Carolina Rodríguez Gutiérrez (born 30 September 1993) is a Mexican racing cyclist, who last rode for UCI Women's Team . She competed in the 2013 UCI women's road race in Florence.

Major results

2012
 3rd Road race, National Road Championships
2013
 3rd Road race, National Road Championships
2015
 5th Overall Vuelta Internacional Femenina a Costa Rica
2016
 2nd Road race, National Road Championships
 4th Grand Prix de Venezuela
 5th Overall Vuelta Internacional Femenina a Costa Rica
 8th Overall Vuelta Femenil Internacional
2017
 National Road Championships
2nd Road race
3rd Time trial
2018
 6th Overall Tour of California
2019
 1st Stage 3 Vuelta Femenina a Guatemala

References

External links

1993 births
Living people
Mexican female cyclists
People from Toluca
Cyclists at the 2016 Summer Olympics
Olympic cyclists of Mexico
20th-century Mexican women
21st-century Mexican women